Rolf Nitzsche (18 September 1930 – 3 August 2015) was a German cyclist. He competed in the team pursuit event at the 1956 Summer Olympics.

References

External links
 

1930 births
2015 deaths
German male cyclists
Olympic cyclists of the United Team of Germany
Cyclists at the 1956 Summer Olympics
Place of birth missing
East German male cyclists
Cyclists from Saxony
People from Zittau
People from Bezirk Dresden